Hetang District is one of four urban districts of Zhuzhou City, Hunan province, China.

As of 2015, it had a permanent resident population of 311,400.  The government seat is at Guihua Subdistrict.

Administrative divisions
According to the result on adjustment of subdistrict divisions of Hetang District on November 20, 2015, Hetang District has 5 subdistricts and a town under its jurisdiction. they are:

5 subdistricts
 Cigutang
 Guihua
 Jinshan
 Songjiaqiao
 Yuetang

1 town
 Xianyu

References

www.xzqh.org 

 
County-level divisions of Hunan
Zhuzhou